Statistics of Emperor's Cup in the 1949 season.

Overview
It was contested by 5 teams, and University of Tokyo LB won the championship.

Results

Quarterfinals
Kandai Club 5–2 Aisho Club

Semifinals
University of Tokyo LB 7–1 Toyo Industries
Nittetsu Futase 0–4 Kandai Club

Final

University of Tokyo LB 5–2 Kandai Club
University of Tokyo LB won the championship.

References
 NHK

Emperor's Cup